Route 138 is a numbered State Highway running  in Rhode Island.  It is the longest state numbered route in Rhode Island, and the second longest highway after US 1.  Route 138 begins in Exeter at the Connecticut state line in the west and runs to the Massachusetts state line in Tiverton in the east, and is the only state-numbered route to completely cross Rhode Island. Route 138 also keeps the same route number on the other side of both state lines.

Route 138 is a major thoroughfare in southern Rhode Island. The route ultimately connects Interstate 95 and the University of Rhode Island campus with the island town of Jamestown, the city of Newport, as well as the Tiverton-Little Compton coastal region. At the Massachusetts border in Fall River, the route continues as Massachusetts Route 138, which extends north into the Greater Boston area.

Route description
Route 138 takes the following route through the State:
Exeter: ; Connecticut State line at Route 138 to Hopkinton town line
Spring Street
Hopkinton: ; Exeter town line to Richmond town line
Spring Street, Nooseneck Hill Road and Main Street
Richmond: ; Hopkinton town line to South Kingstown town line
Main Street and Kingstown Road
South Kingstown: ; Richmond town line to North Kingstown town line
Usquepaugh Road, Kingstown Road, Moorsefield Road and Tower Hill Road
North Kingstown: ; South Kingstown town line to Jamestown town line
Tower Hill Road and Route 138 Expressway
Jamestown: ; North Kingstown town line to Newport city line
Route 138 Expressway

Newport: ; Jamestown town line to Middletown town line
Route 138 Expressway and Admiral Kalbfus Road
Middletown: ; Newport city line to Portsmouth town line
West Main Road and East Main Road
Portsmouth: ; Middletown town line to Tiverton town line
East Main Road and Fall River Expressway
Tiverton: ; Portsmouth town line to Massachusetts State line at Route 138
Fall River Expressway and Main Road

History

Route 138 used the Stone Bridge over the Sakonnet River until 1954.

Before the opening of the Jamestown section of the Route 138 Expressway in 1994, Route 138 came off the Jamestown Bridge and used Eldred Avenue (which has now been partially cut off by the Expressway) and East Shore Road to the Newport Pell Bridge.  As of 2005, there is still a Route 138 reassurance marker northbound on East Shore Road just north of the Newport Pell Bridge.

Prior to the construction of the Route 138 Expressway in North Kingstown, Route 138 used Bridgetown Road east of U.S. 1 in South Kingstown, then north on Route 1A into North Kingstown, then along an access road to the Jamestown-Verrazano Bridge which was upgraded on the spot to the Route 138 Expressway.

There are two abandoned temporary ramps at the west end of the Jamestown Bridge used by through traffic in the early 1990s.  These ramps connected through traffic to the old bridge while the new one was being built.  The new Jamestown Verrazzano Bridge opened in 1992. These ramps have since been converted into access points to the local beaches.

The Route 138 Expressway was intended to extend west to Interstate 95.  For more information, see Interstate 895 (Rhode Island/Massachusetts).

Route 138 officially goes from being signed East/West to being signed North/South at the intersection of Admiral Kalbfus Road and West Main Road on the Middletown/Newport line.

Major intersections

Route 138A

Route 138A is a numbered state highway running  through Newport and Middletown, Rhode Island. Route 138A is a "scenic route" highway that begins at Route 238 at the intersection of America's Cup Avenue and Gladys Carr Bolhouse Road (which goes to Goat Island) where it follows America's Cup Avenue southwards, travels through downtown Newport, past the Newport beaches, and north through Middletown where it connects with Route 138.

Route description
 In Newport: 2.1 miles—beginning at America's Cup Avenue, along Memorial Boulevard West, and Memorial Boulevard to the Middletown town line.
 In Middletown: 2.5 miles—beginning at the Newport city line, along Aquidneck Avenue to Route 138 (East Main Road).

History
Most of the streets along Route 138A were built after 1965.  Route 138A never represented an old alignment of Route 138.

Major intersections

References

External links

2019 Highway Map, Rhode Island

138
Transportation in Washington County, Rhode Island
Transportation in Newport County, Rhode Island